Ethnic groups of India, known as "gypsies":
 Domba
 Banjara

See also
Gypsy (disambiguation)